The 1999 Dakar Rally, also known as the 1999 Granada–Dakar Rally was the 21st running of the Dakar Rally event. After a short prologue stage on New Year's Eve 1998, the race began in earnest on 1 January 1999 and ended on 17 January after 16 competitive stages. After the fifth stage, the overall rally leader was German driver, Jutta Kleinschmidt, who, in the 1998 rally, was the first woman to ever win a stage of the rally. The event was marked by a robbery on the 12th stage of the rally between Néma and Tichit in Mauritania of fifty competitors by armed men, in which vehicles, money and petrol were stolen. Rally co-ordinators decided to continue with the race. The rally was won by French driver Jean-Louis Schlesser. The motorcycle title was won by Richard Sainct, whilst the truck title went to Karel Loprais in a Tatra 815.

Stages

Stage Results

Motorcycles

Cars

Trucks

Final standings

Motorcycles

Cars

Trucks

References

Dakar Rally
D
Dakar Rally, 1999
1999 in rallying